Ali Faraj Al-Zubaidi (born 4 January 1993) is a Saudi international footballer who plays for Al-Fateh as a right back.

Club career
Al-Zubaidi joined Al-Ettifaq and established himself in the starting position.

International career
Al-Zubaidi made his competitive international debut against Iran

Honours
Al-Ahli
 Saudi Professional League: 2015-16
 King Cup: 2016
 Saudi Super Cup: 2016

References

1993 births
Living people
Saudi Arabian footballers
Sportspeople from Jeddah
Association football defenders
Ettifaq FC players
Al-Ahli Saudi FC players
Al-Raed FC players
Al-Wehda Club (Mecca) players
Al-Fayha FC players
Al-Fateh SC players
Saudi Professional League players
Saudi First Division League players
Saudi Arabia international footballers
Saudi Arabia youth international footballers